Nissany is a Hebrew surname. Notable people with the surname include:

 Chanoch Nissany (born 1963), Israeli-Hungarian racing driver
 Roy Nissany (born 1994), French-Israeli racing driver, son of Chanoch

Hebrew-language surnames